Agnel Institute of Technology and Design, Assagao is an Engineering College located in the village of Assagao in Bardez, India. It was established in the year 2012 and approved by AICTE and is affiliated with Goa University.
The college is named after Fr. Agnelo. The college campus was designed by civil engineer Olavo Carvalho.

The second campus of the Centre for Incubation and Business Acceleration (CIBA) was opened at AITD in 2015.

Courses offered
The institute offers the following Bachelor of Engineering (B.E.) programmes:
 Mechanical Engineering (60 Seats + 12 lateral entry)
 Electronics and Communication Engineering (60 Seats +12 lateral entry)
 Computer Engineering (60 seats + 12 lateral entry)

The college also has a Corporate Institute Relationship Cell (CIRC) to aid with campus placements.

Cultural and non-academic activities

AITD conducts an annual cultural event called Fusion of Art, Culture and Talent (FACT). It also conducts an annual industry-academia meet called "Colloquium". It has an Institution of Electronics and Telecommunication Engineers (IETE) students’ forum (ISF). It also has an active students' chapter of the Goa Technology Association (GTA).

The college began publishing a magazine, Renaissance, in 2016.

Sister institutes
 Fr. Conceicao Rodrigues College of Engineering, Bandra, Mumbai
 Fr. Conceicao Rodrigues Institute of Technology, Vashi, Mumbai
 Padre Conceicao College of Engineering, Verna, Goa
 Father Agnel Polytechnic, New Delhi

References

External links
 

Engineering colleges in Goa
Educational institutions established in 2012
Buildings and structures in North Goa district
Education in North Goa district
2012 establishments in Goa